Daylighted and similar may refer to:
 Daylighting in the architectural sense, to use natural light for indoor illumination
 Daylighting (streams)
 Daylighting (tunnels)